Abhi To Jee Lein is a 1977 Bollywood drama film directed and written by Roshan Taneja.

Plot 
Deepak comes from an upper-middle-class family, studies in college, and woos fellow collegian, Rita, who is also in love with him. It is time for College Students' Association Elections, and there is hectic activity within the campus, which is complicated by the active involvement of outside, quite violent elements, who are not students. In this virulent atmosphere, another student, Jaya, is molested by a student named Rakesh. Deepak, Danny (who is Jaya's boyfriend), and Mukesh come to her rescue, and Rakesh gets killed. The elections are postponed, and the trio are on the run from the police – who have launched a manhunt for them. The College Principal announces fresh elections, and with no one to challenge outside elements, it looks like the campus will be taken over by political parties – who may have a vested interest in canvasing the future vote in India's elections – leading to even more chaos and instability.

Cast
Jaya Bachchan as Jaya
Kiran Kumar as Deepak
Radha Saluja as Rita
Danny Denzongpa as Danny
Simi Garewal as Ms. Mahajan (Lecturer)
Farida Jalal as Nun
Paintal as Bunty
Iftekhar as Deepak's Father
Surendra as Mukesh
Shashi Kiran as Shashi

Playback singers
Kishore Kumar
Asha Bhosle

Music
"Too Lali Hai Savere Wali" - Kishore Kumar, Asha Bhosle
"Jab Raam Naam Le Le Har Kaam Ho Jaaye, Jitni Badi Ho Mushkil Aasan Ho Jaaye" - Kishore Kumar
"Principal Murdabad Management Murdabad Abhi Toh Jee Le" - Kishore Kumar
"Kabhi Chali Aa Aashiko Ki Gali" - Kishore Kumar, Asha Bhosle
"Na Jaane Agla Pal Hoga Kaisa" - Kishore Kumar
"Kayi Gham Sahi Hai Khushi Ke Liye" - Kishore Kumar

References

External links
 

1977 films
1970s Hindi-language films
Films scored by Sapan-Jagmohan
Indian drama films